Shoot wrestling is a combat sport that originated in Japan's professional wrestling circuit of the 1970s. Professional wrestlers of that era attempted to use more realistic or even "full contact" moves in their matches to increase their excitement, diminishing or eschewing the theatrical elements, looking more similar to an actual, unscripted fight. The name "shoot wrestling" comes from the professional wrestling term "shoot", which refers to any unscripted occurrence within a scripted wrestling event. Prior to the emergence of the current sport of shoot wrestling, the term was commonly used in the professional wrestling business, particularly in the United Kingdom, as a synonym for the sport of catch wrestling.  Shoot wrestling can be used to describe a range of hybrid fighting systems such as shootfighting, shoot boxing and the styles of mixed martial arts done in the Shooto, Pancrase and RINGS promotions. Organizations, promotions and gyms with origins in shoot wrestling are referred as the "U-Kei".

History 
Historically, shoot wrestling has been influenced by many martial arts, most influential of them being catch wrestling, but also freestyle wrestling, Greco-Roman wrestling, and then sambo, karate, Muay Thai and judo in the sport's later stages. 

Karl Gotch is one of the most important figures in the development of shoot wrestling. Karl Gotch would begin his journey into wrestling in the German and North American professional wrestling circuits, where Gotch found moderate success. However, it was in his tours of Japan that the early formations of shoot wrestling took place. Gotch was a student of the "Snake Pit" gym, run by the renowned catch wrestler Billy Riley of Wigan. The gym was the centre of learning submission wrestling as practiced in the mining town of Wigan, popularly known as catch-as-catch-can wrestling. It was here that Karl Gotch honed his catch wrestling skills. Karl Gotch also travelled to India to practice the wrestling form of Pehlwani; later on he would propagate the exercises using the "Hindu mace" (large clubs) and would go on to incorporate the Indian system of exercises using push-ups, neck exercises, yogic breathing exercises and "Hindu squats" for conditioning. Gotch attained legendary status in Japan, earning the nickname God of Wrestling. In the 1970s he taught catch wrestling-based hooking and shooting to the likes of Antonio Inoki, Tatsumi Fujinami, Yoshiaki Fujiwara, Satoru Sayama, Masami Soranaka, and Akira Maeda. Most of these professional wrestlers already had backgrounds in legitimate martial arts. Masami Soranaka had been a student of full contact karate, kodokan judo, and sumo. Yoshiaki Fujiwara was already a black belt in judo, while Satoru Sayama had studied Muay Thai with Toshio Fujiwara and went on to study sambo with Victor Koga. This would eventually lead to the added influences of karate, Muay Thai and judo to the wrestling style.

One of Gotch's students, Antonio Inoki, hosted a series of mixed martial arts matches in which he pitted his "strong style professional wrestling" against other martial arts in an attempt to show that professional wrestling and shoot wrestling were the strongest fighting disciplines. Inoki would go on to teach these fighting techniques to a new generation of wrestlers in the dojo of his professional wrestling promotion, New Japan Pro-Wrestling. These matches eventually culminated into the Muhammad Ali vs. Antonio Inoki, while many of them were predeterminated, Ali and Inoki couldn't agree in a winner and looser and the match turned into a "Shoot".

Later on, many wrestlers became interested in promoting this more realistic style of professional wrestling and in 1984, the Universal Wrestling Federation was formed. The UWF was a professional wrestling organisation that promoted the shoot and strong styles of wrestling. While predetermined, the UWF featured effective and practical martial arts moves, which were applied with force. The organization would even host some legitimate mixed martial arts fights, where the UWF wrestlers were able to test their shoot wrestling techniques against fighters with other styles, mimicking Inoki's own exploits. However, internal conflicts between the wrestlers soon resulted in a breakup of the company.

After the breakup of the original Universal Wrestling Federation, shoot wrestling branched into several disciplines. One of the first top stars to leave was "Tiger Mask" Satoru Sayama in 1985, he was dissatisfied with the UWF's internal politics and decided to follow his dream of founding his own martial art school, he used his knowledge in various martial arts to create a legit style of fighting using shoot-wrestling as a base, which he named "Shooto". Even though he returned to pro wrestling a few years later. Nobuhiko Takada and his supporters went to found UWF International, Akira Maeda founded Fighting Network RINGS while Yoshiaki Fujiwara went to found Pro Wrestling Fujiwara Gumi ("Fujiwara family"), in the latter, a few wrestlers such as Masakatsu Funaki and Minoru Suzuki, dissatisfied with Fujiwara's turn to lucha libre-inspired style and lack of focus in fighting skills, founded Pancrase in 1993, a company which used shoot-wrestling rules but promoted real unscripted fights.

The multiple successors and organizations inspired by the UWF range from professional wrestling, to MMA and even standalone martial arts styles, they are collectively known as the "U-Kei" ("U-Group" or "U-Class").

Shoot wrestling itself was popular until the mid-90s due the demise of the UWFi in 1996 and the simultaneous rise of Mixed martial arts in Japan led to a sharp decline in popularity. Most shoot wrestlers started to migrate into MMA—Fighting Network RINGS itself became a full MMA promotion—or back to more theatrical forms of professional wrestling.

Currently, a few companies have been promoting shoot-wrestling events. GLEAT is a Japanese promotion founded in 2020 by LIDET Entertainment consists of former Pro Wrestling NOAH officials. The "Lidet UWF" is a sub-brand which has UWF-style matches. Game Changer Wrestling—an American New Jersey-based promotion—promotes shoot-style wrestling events known as the GCW Bloodsport. The events counted with former MMA and shoot-inspired pro wrestlers such as Minoru Suzuki, Josh Barnett, Matt Riddle and Dan Severn.

Major forms 
Shoot wrestling branched into several sub disciplines after the breakup of the original Universal Wrestling Federation. The main forms and revivals are listed below.

Yoshiaki Fujiwara's students Masakatsu Funaki and Minoru Suzuki founded Pancrase, a mixed martial arts promotion which originally used shoot wrestling rules in real non-scripted matches.
"Tiger Mask" Satoru Sayama founded Shooto, which added Muay Thai, Sambo and Judo to the shoot wrestling arsenal, and turned it into a real pratical martial art.
Kickboxer Caesar Takeshi founded Shoot boxing, a Stand-up fighting league allowing standing submissions and throws.
Akira Maeda founded Fighting Network Rings, a defunct organization which emphasised submissions.
Another Yoshiaki Fujiwara student, Bart Vale, developed Shootfighting.
World-renowned gyms like the Lion's Den, Takada Dojo, and the Shamrock Martial Arts Academy propagate the shoot wrestling-based style.
Dutch kickboxer and MMA legend Bas Rutten trained with shoot wrestler Masakatsu Funaki.
Junior National Korean taekwondo champion Masa Kin Jim has trained in shoot wrestling. During a brief tour of Japan promoting Korean Martial Arts, Masa Kin Jim became fascinated with the shoot wrestling style.  In 1998, he would go on to open one of the first shoot wrestling academies in South Korea.
In 2004, shoot wrestling received official sport status in western Canada and was eligible for licensing. The first of many matches were held open to the public to build a foundation of awareness for the new sport.

See also
 Pancrase
 Professional wrestling in Japan
 Shootfighting
 Shooto

Footnotes

References

External links
Scientific Wrestling.
Website of the film 'Catch - the hold not taken', which looks at the history of shoot wrestling
 Chan, Sam. The Japanese Pro-Wrestling: Reality Based Martial Art Connection. bjj.org. URL last accessed January 7, 2006.

Hybrid martial arts
Wrestling
Japanese martial arts
Sports originating in Japan
History of professional wrestling